Houcine Slaoui (pronounced Husyn Slawi, ; real name Houcine Ben Bouchaïb; 1918–1951) was a Moroccan singer and composer who had a considerable influence on early-modern Moroccan Chaabi music.

Biography

Early life 
As a child, Houcine Ben Bouchaïb would skip school to practice music with an improvised instrument in the quiet of the cemetery. He became a popular entertainer known as a hlaiqi (from  halaqa, a form of popular theater and entertainment, such as the kinds performed at Jemaa el-Fnaa), a troubadour, at the age of 12. His music addressed the ills of the new urban society in Morocco brought about under the French Protectorate: the tears in the social fabric, the rural exodus, and the proletarianization of the population. He traveled around back and forth across Morocco, ailing the wounds with his music.

Early career 
He got his break at 17 when offered a contract while performing with a halaqa in the Morocco pavilion at the 1937  in Paris. He later adopted the nickname "Slaoui," from by his birthplace, Salé, and emerged as one of the principal craftsmen of the modern Chaabi songs in Morocco.

Dakhlat l-Marikan 
He spent some years in France, where he became friends with the Tunisian Mohammed Jemmoussi and the Algerian Amraoui Missoum. With the onset of World War II, Slaoui returned to Morocco. He witnessed the Allied invasion of Morocco in 1942 and the famine known as the  1944–45. In response to the American invasion, he composed and recorded in 1944 his most celebrated song: "" ("Dakhlat l-Marikan" lit. 'The Americans Have Arrived'), a ballad ironically chronicling the American landing and occupation that has been covered by various artists and remains popular in Morocco.

Return to France 
Upon his return to France after the war, he stayed by the Moroccan footballer Larbi Benbarek. Slaoui signed with Pathé-Marconi, which had also signed Frank Sinatra and Édith Piaf. He recorded in a studio in the neighborhood of Saint-Michel in the Latin Quarter near a  owned by Mohammed Ftouki—father of the singer who would come to be known as Warda Al-Jazairia—where stars of North African and Middle Eastern music including Farid al-Atrash, Mohammed Abdel Wahab, Warda, and Nasri Shamseddine performed. Slaoui performed there too. He was offered a role with the rising Lebanese star Sabah. 

He was one of the first to introduce modern musical instruments into Moroccan music. He was influenced by such Middle Eastern artists as Mohammed Abdel Wahab and blended some of the styles of early Egyptian pop music into his songs.

Until this day his death circumstances remain mysterious.

Discography 
 Aîta Bedaouia 
 Hdi Rassak 
 Ya Amina 
 El American 
 El Kahla 
 El Kass Hlou 
 N'zaha 
 Dak Babaq
 Smra 
 Sania Oul Bir 
 Tanja ya al Alia 
 Lalla Ilali 
 Samra wa Khomouria 
 Hahoua Tani 
 Errada
 Sidi Lahbib 
 Ya Mouja Ghani 
 Ya Ghrib Lik Allah 
 El Haïlat

References 

1921 births
1951 deaths
Moroccan composers
20th-century Moroccan male singers
People from Salé
20th-century composers